Paul Mierkiewicz is an American football coach.  He served as the head football coach at Hastings College from  2001 to 2010, Loras College from 2011 to 2013, and McPherson College in McPherson, Kansas from 2015 to 2018, compiling a career college football coaching record of 76–91.

Head coaching record

References

Year of birth missing (living people)
Living people
Hastings Broncos football coaches
Loras Duhawks football coaches
McPherson Bulldogs football coaches